Roger Sabin is an English writer about comics and lecturer at Central St. Martins in London, England.

Work
Sabin is best known for his books Adult Comics which has gone through a number of editions, remaining in print for 20 years and is the standard academic work on the history of the comic book form, and Comics, Comix & Graphic Novels: A History of Comic Art a cultural history of comics for both popular and scholarly audiences. He has also written newspaper articles on the topic of comics, film and punk culture.

Bibliography

Books
Adult Comics: An Introduction (Taylor & Francis, 1993, Routledge, 2005)
Comics, Comix and Graphic Novels: A History of Comic Art (Phaidon, 1996)
The Lasting of the Mohicans: History of an American Myth (University Press of Mississippi, 1996)
The Movie Book: An A-Z guide to 500 landmark individuals working in film (Phaidon, 1999)
Punk Rock: So What?: The Cultural Legacy of Punk (Routledge, 1999)
Below Critical Radar: Fanzines and Alternative Comics from 1976 to the Present Day (Slab-O-Concrete, 2000)
Cop Shows: A Critical History of Police Dramas on Television (McFarland & Co Inc, 2015)

Papers
"Crisis in Modern American and British Comics, and the Possibilities of the Internet as a Solution", in Anne Magnussen & Hans-Christian Christiansen (Eds.), Comics & Culture: Analytical and Theoretical Approaches to Comics, pp. 43–58. Museum Tusculanum Press, 2000. .
"Ally Sloper: The First Comics Superstar?", Image & Narrative #7, October 2003
"Comics", in Daniele Albertazzi & Paul Cobley (Eds.), The Media: An Introduction (3rd ed.), pp. 77–87. Harlow: Longman, 2010. .

Notes

Year of birth missing (living people)
Living people
English writers
Comics critics